Gilberto Gil (also commonly referred to as Gilberto Gil (Frevo Rasgado) to differentiate it from Gil's other self-titled releases) is the second studio album by Gilberto Gil, originally released in early 1968. The album features a blending of traditional Brazilian styles such as samba and bossa nova with American rock and roll. It also mixes Rogério Duprat's orchestral arrangements with the electric guitars of Brazilian rock group Os Mutantes.

Critical reception
The album is number 78 on Rolling Stone Brasil's List of 100 greatest Brazilian albums of all time. The magazine also voted the track "Domingo no Parque" as the 11th greatest Brazilian song.

In 2017, Pitchfork placed it at number 99 on the "200 Best Albums of the 1960s" list.

Track listing

Personnel
 Gilberto Gil – vocals, acoustic guitar
 Os Mutantes – backing vocals, instrumental backing
 Rogério Duprat – arrangement

References

External links
 

Gilberto Gil albums
1968 albums
Philips Records albums